The men's road race at the 1995 UCI Road World Championships was the 62nd edition of the event. The race took place on Sunday 8 October 1995 in Duitama, Colombia. The race was won by Abraham Olano of Spain.

Final classification

References

Men's Road Race
UCI Road World Championships – Men's road race